"Million Pieces" is a song by Swedish singer Tove Styrke from her debut studio album, Tove Styrke (2010). It was released as Styrke's debut single on 25 June 2010 through Sony Music. The song peaked at number 18 on the Sverigetopplistan singles chart.

Background
After finishing third on the sixth season of Idol in December 2009, Tove Styrke stepped out of the spotlight. In May 2010, Aftonbladet revealed she had begun recording her debut studio album with Sony Music. The song "Million Pieces", written by Adam Olenius of Swedish indie pop band Shout Out Louds and singer-songwriter Lykke Li, was chosen as her debut single. Lotus and 2manyfreckles produced the track, while Anders Hvenare handled mixing. In an interview for Aftonbladet, Styrke described the song as "kind" compared to other "crazy" album tracks. 

"Million Pieces" was announced as the first single from her then-forthcoming debut album Tove Styrke (2010) on 22 June 2010 via a press release issued by the label. A snippet of the song was also uploaded to YouTube and the full song premiered on Sveriges Radio P3 on the same date. Sony Music made the single available for digital download on 25 June 2010, followed by a CD single release on 30 June. At the time of the song's release, Styrke said "The most important thing has been that I really love the music. I have not created music that others expect or to please anyone. This is music I stand behind to 100%." A remixed by Swedish producer Familjen was released on 20 August 2010.

Track listing
CD single / digital download
 "Million Pieces" – 3:39

Digital download
 "Million Pieces" (Familjen remix) – 4:30

Credits and personnel
Credits are adapted from the Tove Styrke liner notes.

Adam Olenius – songwriting
Lykke Li – songwriting
Lotus – production
2manyfreckles – production
Anders Hvenare – mixing

Chart performance

Release history

References

2010 songs
2010 singles
2010 debut singles
Tove Styrke songs
Songs written by Lykke Li
Sony Music singles